Maria Helena "Mimi" Pollak (9 April 1903 – 11 August 1999) was a Swedish actress and theatre director.

Biography 
Maria Helena Pollak was born in Karlstad, Värmland to  Austrian-Jewish parents and was trained in the performing arts at the prestigious Royal Dramatic Training Academy in Stockholm 1922-24.

Pollak worked in the 1920s and 1930s as a film actress and as stage actress mainly on Helsingborg City Theatre and The Blanche Theatre, Stockholm, but she returned as an actress to Royal Dramatic Theatre ( Dramaten) 1942.

Pollak became in 1948 the first contracted female director at the Dramaten with the production of Jean Genet's Jungfruleken (Les Bonnes/The Maids), starring Anita Björk and Maj-Britt Nilsson in the leads. Pollak became a very successful director at Dramaten and staged altogether 60 plays at the national stage over the years.

She appeared since her 1922 debut in the film Amatörfilmen in about 30 film and TV productions. Notable film roles are her supporting parts in Schamyl Bauman's film comedy Skolka skolan (1949), in Vilgot Sjöman's Klänningen (a.k.a. The Dress, 1964), in Ingmar Bergman's Autumn Sonata (starring Ingrid Bergman) as the piano teacher, in Flight of the Eagle (1982), starring Max von Sydow and directed by Jan Troell and in the very popular Swedish TV mystery Agnes Cecilia - en sällsam historia (1991), adapted from the successful books by Maria Gripe.

She retired in 1975, but made a stage comeback in 1991, age 87, in Anton Chekhov's Uncle Vanya.

Sometimes credited as Mimmi Pollak, Mimi Pollack or Mimmi Pollack.

Personal life 
Pollak attended the Royal Dramatic Theatre school in Stockholm, Sweden with fellow actress Greta Garbo from 1922 to 1924. Garbo moved to the US in 1925 and Pollak married in 1927 and later had children, although they did maintain contact for over 60 years.
Their relationship and letters are portrayed (published in parts) in the Swedish book Djävla älskade unge! (Bloody Beloved Kid), written by Po Tin Andersén Axell (2005), and in Garbo's personal writings, released in Sweden the same year.

Pollak was married 1927-1938 to Swedish actor Nils Lundell (1889–1943). Her son, Lars Lundell, saved and provided to author Tin Andersen Axell the letters Greta wrote to his mother.

Selected filmography 
1991 – Agnes Cecilia - en sällsam historia
1986 – Amorosa
1985 - August Strindberg ett liv (TV)
1982 – The Flight of the Eagle (Ingenjör Andrées luftfärd)
1978 – Autumn Sonata (Höstsonaten)
1979 – I frid och värdighet
1979 - Christopher's House
1971 – Emil i Lönneberga
1965 – Nightmare
1964 – The Dress
1956 - Rätten att älska
1955 – Mord, lilla vän
1951 – Sommarlek
1949 – Playing Truant
1949 – Bara en mor (a.k.a. Only A Mother)
1949 – The Street
1947 – Den långa vägen
1947 – Dinner for Two 
1942 – Lågor i dunklet
1942 – We House Slaves 
1941 – The Ghost Reporter
1940 – Med dej i mina armar
1940 One, But a Lion!
1938 –  The Great Love 
1926 – Sven Klingas levnadsöde
1923 – Andersson, Pettersson och Lundström
1922 – Amatörfilmen

Footnotes

Further reading

External links

 Mimi Pollak

1903 births
1999 deaths

Swedish film actresses
Swedish Jews
Swedish people of Austrian-Jewish descent
Swedish silent film actresses
20th-century Swedish actresses
Swedish theatre directors